Adémọ́lá is both a given name and a surname of Yoruba origin, meaning "the crown or royalty along with prestige and wealth". Notable people with the name include:

Given name
Ayoade Ademola Adeseun (born 1953), Nigerian politician who was elected Senator for Oyo Central in 2011
Ademola Bankole (born 1969), Nigerian professional footballer born in Lagos
Ademola Lookman (born 1997), English professional footballer
Ademola Okulaja (born 1975), German professional basketball player currently playing for Brose Baskets from Germany
Ademola Rasaq Seriki (born 1959), Lagos Island born Nigerian politician, teacher, businessman, accountant and public administrator
Ademola Ishola Akangbe aka LOKOBO (born 1989), Oyo State (Komu, Itesiwaju LGA) born Nigeria business Administration, Accountant, Entrepreneur and Businessman
Ademola Adeniregun (born 1958), Nigerian Father
Ademola Faleye (born 2002), American football tight end for the Michigan State Spartans

Surname
Adetokunbo Ademola, KBE (1906–1993), Nigerian jurist and son of the paramount ruler of Abeokuta, Western Nigeria
Felix Ademola (born 1974), Nigerian football player
Hezekiah Ademola Oluwafemi, the Vice Chancellor of Obafemi Awolowo University from 1966 to 1975
Moses Ademola (born 1989), professional footballer currently playing for English League Two side Brentford
Muyiwa Ademola (born 1971), Nigerian actor

References

Yoruba given names
Yoruba-language surnames